Pyotr Kuzmich Pakhtusov (1800 in Kronstadt – November 19, 1835 in Arkhangelsk) was a Russian surveyor and Arctic explorer. He is credited with the first thorough survey of Novaya Zemlya.

Between 1832 and 1835 Pakhtusov undertook two exploratory journeys to Novaya Zemlya. He wintered on the island on the two occasions and took detailed meteorological observations.

Pakhtusov carefully surveyed the southern and eastern parts of Novaya Zemlya along with fellow explorer and cartographer Avgust Tsivolko during the last two years of the expedition. Thanks to their work the first reliable maps of Novaya Zemlya's southern shores and part of the northern island's coastline, were published.

A small island in the eastern shore of Novaya Zemlya and a group of islands in the Nordenskiöld Archipelago are named after Pyotr Kuzmich Pakhtusov.
His feat as a scientist and researcher was immortalized in 1886. Colleagues of Pakhtusov and expedition members had initiated the creation of this monument in Kronstadt.

References

 & Russian Arctic Exploration
Novaya Zemlya, a Russian Arctic Land
Picture of a monument to Pakhtusov
History of the Northern Sea Route
Eulogy of Russia's pioneering Arctic explorers

1800 births
1835 deaths
Explorers of the Arctic
Russian and Soviet polar explorers
Explorers from the Russian Empire
Year of birth unknown
Year of death unknown
19th-century people from the Russian Empire
19th-century explorers